The 1997–98 FA Cup (known as The FA Cup sponsored by Littlewoods for sponsorship reasons) was the 117th staging of the FA Cup. The competition was won by Arsenal with a 2–0 victory against Newcastle United at Wembley Stadium.

Calendar

First round proper

Teams from the Football League Second and Third Division entered in this round, and four non-league teams, Woking, Dagenham & Redbridge, Stevenage Borough and Hednesford Town, were given byes to this round. The matches were played on 14 November 1997. There were fourteen replays, with four ties requiring a penalty shootout to settle them.

Second round proper

The second round of the competition featured the winners of the first round ties. The matches were scheduled to be played on Saturday 6 December 1997, with nine replays and three penalty shootouts required, each of which featured a team who won on penalties in the previous round.

Third round proper

The third round was scheduled for Saturday 3 January 1998, although six matches were postponed until later dates. This round marked the point at which the teams in the two highest divisions in the English league system, the Premiership and the Football League First Division, entered the competition. There were eight replays, with two of these games requiring a penalty shootout to settle it.

Emley of the Northern Premier League made national headlines, when, after coming through the non-league qualifying, and seeing off Morecambe and Lincoln City in the previous rounds, they only lost narrowly to a West Ham United team containing the likes of Rio Ferdinand, David Unsworth, Eyal Berkovic, John Hartson and Frank Lampard.

Fourth round proper

The fourth round ties were played with the 32 winners of the previous round. The matches were originally scheduled for Saturday 24 January 1998. There were five replays, with one penalty shootout.

Fifth round proper

The fifth round matches were scheduled for Saturday 14 February 1998. There were four replays, with one penalty shootout.

The biggest surprise of the round was arguably Barnsley's 3–2 win (in the replay that followed a 1–1 draw) over Manchester United. Barnsley were in their first season as a top division side (and ended it with relegation), while United were defending league champions and were also in contention for the league title and the European Cup at this time, although they ended the season trophyless.

Sixth round proper

The sixth round ties were scheduled for the weekend of 7 and 8 March 1998. Two replays were played on the 17th, both of which went to penalties.

Wolverhampton Wanderers and Sheffield United, Division One sides, both progressed to the semi-finals at the expense of Premier League sides. Wolverhampton Wanderers were particularly impressive in doing this, as the side they eliminated from the cup (Leeds United) went on to finish fifth in the Premier League.

Replays

Sheffield United won 3–1 on penalties.

Arsenal won 4–3 on penalties.

Semi-finals

The two semi-final matches were played on Sunday 5 April 1998. Both ties were played at neutral venues and resulted in victories for Arsenal and Newcastle United, who went on to meet in the final at Wembley. The losing sides were both Division One teams, who endured further disappointment over the next few weeks by being pipped to promotion.

Final

The 1998 FA Cup Final was contested by Arsenal and Newcastle United at Wembley on 16 May 1998. Arsenal won 2–0, with goals by Marc Overmars and Nicolas Anelka to complete their second league title/FA Cup double. They joined Manchester United as only the second English team to achieve this, although Arsenal did so with an entirely different set of players (their first double was in 1971, whereas United's doubles were in 1994 and 1996).

Media coverage
In the United Kingdom, ITV were the free to air broadcasters, taking over from the BBC, while Sky Sports were the subscription broadcasters for the tenth consecutive season.

The matches shown live on ITV Sport were: Everton 0–1 Newcastle United (R3); Manchester City 1–2 West Ham United (R4); Arsenal 0–0 Crystal Palace (R5); Arsenal 1–1 West Ham United (QF); Wolverhampton Wanderers 0–1 Arsenal (SF); and Arsenal 2–0 Newcastle United (Final)

References

External links
 The FA website
 BBC Sport FA Cup page
 Results at Soccerbase

 
1997
1997–98 domestic association football cups
1997–98 in English football